CJGM-FM (99.9 MHz) is a commercial radio station in Gananoque, Ontario, Canada. This is the first commercial radio station in Gananoque and it serves the Thousand Islands and parts of Kingston. The station is branded as 99.9 myFM, and features an adult contemporary format. It is owned by My Broadcasting Corporation, with radio studios in The Pump House on Kate Street.

History
The station received Canadian Radio-television and Telecommunications Commission (CRTC) approval on June 23, 2010. MBC initially wanted to offer a blend of country, gold/oldies and adult contemporary music for the new station.

On July 13, 2011, CJGM-FM started on-air tests. It began airing 5,000 songs in a row on July 29. The station officially signed on the air on September 12. The branding remains 99.9 myFM.

References

External links
99.9 myFM
 

JGM
JGM
Radio stations established in 2010
2010 establishments in Ontario
JGM